East Wabash Historic District is a national historic district located at Wabash, Wabash County, Indiana. It encompasses 204 contributing buildings in a predominantly residential section of Wabash.  It developed between about 1850 and 1930, and includes representative examples of Federal, Italianate, Second Empire, Queen Anne, Colonial Revival, and Bungalow / American Craftsman style architecture. Notable buildings include the George and Sophie Lumaree House (c. 1880), Treaty Stone and Lime Company (1887), Grandstaff Hentgen Funeral Service, James D. Conner House (c. 1860), Cowgill House (c. 1880), Kaiser Hotel (c. 1887), C.W. Cowgill House (1850), and St. Matthew's Evangelical and Reformed Church (1862, 1879).

It was listed on the National Register of Historic Places in 2011.

References

Historic districts on the National Register of Historic Places in Indiana
Federal architecture in Indiana
Italianate architecture in Indiana
Second Empire architecture in Indiana
Queen Anne architecture in Indiana
Colonial Revival architecture in Indiana
Bungalow architecture in Indiana
Historic districts in Wabash, Indiana
National Register of Historic Places in Wabash County, Indiana